Na Pho is the northernmost district (amphoe) of Buriram province, northeastern Thailand.

Geography
Neighbouring districts are (from the south clockwise) Phutthaisong of Buriram Province,
Nong Song Hong of Khon Kaen province, Na Chueak and Yang Sisurat of Maha Sarakham province.

History
The minor district (king amphoe) was created on 31 March 1981, when the four tambons Na Pho, Ban Khu, Ban Du, and Don Kok were split off from Phutthaisong district. It was upgraded to a full district on 1 January 1988.

Motto
The Na Pho District's motto is "Northern city of Buriram, excellence culture, rocket festival and beautiful Na Pho's silk."

Administration
The district is divided into five sub-districts (tambons), which are further subdivided into 71 villages (mubans). Na Pho is a township (thesaban tambon) which covers parts of tambons Na Pho and Si Sawang. There are a further five tambon administrative organizations (TAO).

References

External links
amphoe.com

Na Pho